Rayna Cottrell Stewart II (born June 18, 1973) is a former professional American football safety who is the assistant special teams coach for the Dallas Cowboys of the National Football League (NFL). He played five seasons for the Houston/Tennessee Oilers, the Miami Dolphins, and the Jacksonville Jaguars.

References

1973 births
Living people
Sportspeople from Oklahoma City
Players of American football from Oklahoma
American football safeties
Northern Arizona Lumberjacks football players
Houston Oilers players
Tennessee Oilers players
Miami Dolphins players
Jacksonville Jaguars players
Tennessee Titans coaches
Green Bay Packers coaches
Dallas Cowboys coaches